Jamie Ross Strange (born 1976) is a New Zealand politician. He is a Member of Parliament in the House of Representatives for the Labour Party.

Early life, career and family
Strange was born in Nelson in 1976. At 12 years of age, he moved with his family to Hamilton, where he attended Hamilton Boys' High School. Before entering parliament, Strange taught music at Berkley Normal Middle School in Hillcrest, Hamilton. He is also a former church minister.

Strange had a music career and has written over 40 songs and released his own album Thanks for Faking It Sometimes in 2007. The songs videos featured a mannequin who was present to mimic the "plastic-looking" girlfriends rock stars often have. Strange named the mannequin 'Kate Brightstar' after purchasing it from a store called Brightstar and later sold it on TradeMe to a truck driver. He returned to the stage during orientation week 2018 at the University of Waikato, shortly after being elected for the first time.

Jamie Strange is married to Angela Strange, a Hamilton constituency councillor on the Waikato Regional Council. The couple share four children.

Member of Parliament 

Strange stood unsuccessfully for a seat on the Hamilton City Council in 2013. Instead, he stood in Taupō where he was defeated by the incumbent, National's Louise Upston. He was ranked 54 on the Labour party list, too low to be elected.

Strange did not win the electorate, but entered parliament as a list MP. In his first term he served variously on the select committees for education and workforce; governance and administration; foreign affairs, defence and trade; transport and infrastructure; and finance and expenditure.

In July 2018 Strange said he expected a Hamilton to Auckland rail commuter service to be operating by the end of 2019. The opening of the train service, Te Huia, was delayed to 2021 due to the COVID-19 pandemic.

During the 2020 New Zealand general election, Strange successfully contested the Hamilton East electorate, defeating long-time National incumbent David Bennett by a final margin of 2,973 votes. In his second term he was appointed chair of the economic development, science and innovation committee and member of the governance and administration committee. He was also co-chair, with National MP Simeon Brown, of the parliamentary prayer breakfast group.

In mid-December 2022, Strange announced that he would not be contesting the 2023 New Zealand general election and would step down at the end of the 2020–2023 term. Strange attributed his resignation plans to the strain caused by his job travel requirements on family life. He also stated that he was "better suited for government than opposition" in response to polls forecasting a National-ACT electoral victory at the 2023 election.

Political views
Strange has a conservative voting record. He voted against the End of Life Choice Act 2019, Abortion Legislation Act 2020, and the Contraception, Sterilisation, and Abortion (Safe Areas) Amendment Act 2022.

External links 

 Jamie Strange at YouTube

References

Living people
1976 births
New Zealand Labour Party MPs
Members of the New Zealand House of Representatives
Unsuccessful candidates in the 2014 New Zealand general election
New Zealand schoolteachers
New Zealand list MPs
New Zealand musicians
Candidates in the 2020 New Zealand general election